Heino Mandri (11 September 1922 – 3 December 1990) was an Estonian film and stage actor, designated People's Artist of the Estonian SSR (1986).

Biography
Heino Mandri was born in the independent Republic of Estonia. He studied acting at Tallinn State Conservatory (now, the Estonian Academy of Music and Theatre) and graduated in 1946, when post-war Estonia was part of the Soviet Union. At that time Heino Mandri was accused of anti-Soviet activities and sentenced to imprisonment and hard labor in Gulag. From 1948 to 1954 he served the sentence in the Viatlag prison camp, Lesnoy, Kirov Oblast in Northern Russia.

In 1954, Heino Mandri returned from the Viatlag prison camp to Estonian Soviet Socialist Republic. At that time he underwent Soviet censorship procedures before he was permitted to resume his acting career under the Soviet administration.

Acting career
 1958–1966 and since 1972 – an actor at Kingisepp's Tallinn academic theater. 
 1966–1972 – actor at Estonian SSR State Youth Theatre (now, the Tallinn City Theatre). 
 1975–1990 – actor at Tallinn City Theatre.

During the 1970s and 1980s, Heino Mandri casually appeared on Estonian national TV delivering his lines with impeccable command of the Estonian language.

In Soviet films, Heino Mandri was usually cast as characters who were officers of the Wehrmacht, German businessmen, or American spies.

Heino Mandri was acquitted of all political charges and fully rehabilitated in his rights only shortly before his death.

Selected filmography
Põrgupõhja uus Vanapagan (1964)
The Lark (1965)
Counter Measure (1974)
Diamonds for the Dictatorship of the Proletariat (1975)
A Time to Live and a Time to Love (1976)
Young Russia (1981 — 1982)
TASS Is Authorized to Declare... (1984)
Entrance to the Labyrinth (1989)

References

External links
 Kinopoisk.ru
 
  Tmm.ee

Soviet male actors
Estonian male film actors
Estonian male stage actors
Estonian male television actors
People from Kohtla-Järve
1922 births
1990 deaths
20th-century Estonian male actors
Male actors from Tallinn
Estonian Academy of Music and Theatre alumni
Foreign Gulag detainees